Edward Decker (born 1963) is an American businessman and, since 2022, the CEO and president of the world's largest home improvement company, The Home Depot. He was scheduled to become the chairman of the company in October 2022.

Early life
Edward Decker grew up in Fairview Township, Erie County, Pennsylvania, and attended Fairview High School there. In his high school years, he begun managing landscaping and gardening for both residential and commercial customers, after having mowed and helped landscape his family's lawn from the age of eight.

Decker graduated from the College of William and Mary in 1985 with a BA in English and from Carnegie Mellon University in 1993 with an MBA.

Career
Prior to working for The Home Depot, Decker worked in Australia and Pittsburgh for PNC and worked in business development and finance positions at Kimberly-Clark and their property Scott Paper Company, moving to England and Atlanta for the latter positions. At Home Depot, Decker held multiple executive positions following his hiring in 2000, including managing their store and online merchandising. In October 2020, Decker became president and chief operating officer at Home Depot.

Decker was announced as the new CEO and president at Home Depot in January 2022 after 22 years with the company. Decker's appointment to the position coincided with renewed demand for home improvement materials following a lull spurred by the COVID-19 pandemic. Decker took the position in March that year. As CEO, Decker announced Home Depot's record earnings and sales quarter, the company partially citing a global rise in inflation, though Decker also pointed to the rise in "DIY" home projects as bolstering spending.

In August 2022, the board of Home Depot announced that it had elected Decker to assume the position of chairman on October 1 that year, replacing the retiring Craig Menear, who Decker had previously replaced as CEO and company president.

Personal life

Decker and his wife Cathy have two adult daughters.

Decker has donated at least $5800 to the 2024 re-election campaigns of Democratic U.S. Senator Joe Manchin of West Virginia.

References

1963 births
Living people
21st-century American businesspeople
American business executives
Businesspeople from Pennsylvania
College of William & Mary alumni
People from Erie County, Pennsylvania
The Home Depot people
Tepper School of Business alumni